The Branch Rickey Award was given annually to an individual in Major League Baseball (MLB) in recognition of his exceptional community service from 1992 to 2014. The award was named in honor of former player and executive Branch Rickey, who broke the major league color barrier by signing Jackie Robinson, while president and general manager of the Brooklyn Dodgers. Rickey also created the Knothole Gang, a charity that allowed children to attend MLB games.

The award, created by the Rotary Club of Denver in 1991, was first awarded to Dave Winfield in 1992 at their annual banquet. Each MLB team nominates one individual who best exemplifies the Rotary Club motto: "Service Above Self". A vote is then conducted by the national selection committee, which consists of members of the sports media, previous winners of the award, and Rotary district governors in major league cities. Proceeds of the banquet benefit Denver Kids, Inc., a charity for at-risk students who attend Denver Public Schools.

Winners of the Branch Rickey Award have undertaken different causes. Many winners, including Todd Stottlemyre, Jamie Moyer, John Smoltz, Torii Hunter, Vernon Wells, and Shane Victorino, worked with children in need. Stottlemyre visited and raised money for a nine-year-old girl who suffered from aplastic anemia and required a bone marrow transplant, while Moyer's foundation raised US$6 million to support underprivileged children. Other winners devoted their work to aiding individuals who had a specific illness, such as Curt Schilling, who raised money for amyotrophic lateral sclerosis, and Trevor Hoffman, who lost a kidney as an infant and devoted himself to working with individuals with nephropathy. Also, some winners devoted themselves to work with major disasters and tragedies. Bobby Valentine donated money to charities benefiting victims of the September 11 attacks, while Luis Gonzalez worked with survivors of Hurricane Katrina.

Previous winners

See also

Roberto Clemente Award
Players Choice Awards (The Marvin Miller Man of the Year Award)
Bart Giamatti Award
Lou Gehrig Memorial Award
Baseball awards
Clayton Kershaw
Cy Young Award

References
General

Specific

Awards established in 1992
Major League Baseball trophies and awards
Rotary International